Blasco Gardéliz de Ezcároz was the bishop of Pamplona (as Blasco II) from 1068 until 1078 or 1079. He was the prior of the monastery of San Salvador de Leire from 1054 until his election as bishop. Although the bishops of Pamplona had held the abbacy of Leire since the time of Sancho the Great (died 1035), this tradition was broken when Blasco became bishop. The monastery went instead to Fortunio, the bishop of Álava, in 1068.

During Blasco's episcopate, King Sancho IV of Navarre re-established the primacy of the diocese of Pamplona in Navarre over that of Nájera. According to the Crónica de los reyes de Navarra of Prince Charles of Viana (died 1461), Sancho "gave great gifts to [the cathedral of] Santa María de Pamplona and to Bishop Don Blasco."

In 1076, Sancho IV was assassinated and Álava was annexed by Castile. As a result, Fortunio was deprived of Leire and Blasco became abbot. He was thus the last abbot–bishop to hold both offices until his death. His successor, García Ramírez, was deprived of the abbacy before being also deposed as bishop, and they were never united again.

See also
Catholic Church in Spain

Notes

Sources

1070s deaths
Bishops of Pamplona